Iruttu Kadai is an Indian sweets and snacks shop located in Tirunelveli, Tamil Nadu. It is known for "Iruttu Kadai Halwa", a type of Indian sweet halwa made of wheat, sugar and ghee. The store has become a landmark for the city of Tirunelveli over the decades.

History
The halwa shop was established in 1900 and has remained unexpanded ever since. Nevertheless, the store has become a landmark for the city of Tirunelveli.

References

Indian companies established in 1900
Retail companies established in 1900
Companies based in Tirunelveli
Tamil cuisine